Calocosmus magnificus is a species of beetle in the family Cerambycidae. It was described by Fisher in 1932. It is known from Haiti.

References

Calocosmus
Beetles described in 1932